PalaMaggiò is an indoor sporting arena located in Caserta, Italy.  The capacity of the arena is 6,387 spectators and opened in 1982.  It hosts indoor sporting events such as basketball, notably the home matched of Juvecaserta Basket of the Lega Basket Serie A.

References

Indoor arenas in Italy
Basketball venues in Italy